Bungarus magnimaculatus, the Burmese krait, spotted krait or splendid krait, is a species of venomous snake of the genus Bungarus that is endemic to Myanmar.

Description
The head is flat and slightly distinct from the neck. The eyes of this species are generally small to medium in size with black round pupils. Dorsal scales are smooth and glossy with the vertebral row enlarged and hexagonal. The body of this species is triangular shaped in cross-sections. The dorsum has anywhere from 11 to 14 broad, white crossbars, which are as wide as the black interspaces, while the centers of each of the scales is spotted with black. The belly of the Burmese krait is uniformly white in colour.

Distribution and habitat
Currently, this species is understood to be endemic to Myanmar. It can be found in Mandalay, Sagaing, and Magway divisions of Myanmar. It might also occur in adjacent areas of Yunnan Province in China, Thailand, Laos, Bangladesh and/or northeastern parts of India, but it has not yet been observed in any of them.

The type locality of this species is Meiktila, in Upper Myanmar in the Mandalay Division which lies in seasonal dry forest; thus, this species is likely to occur throughout the central dry zone. It occurs in dry tropical lowland forest. Specimens have been located in disturbed habitats close to plantations and villages. This species can be found from near sea level to elevations reaching .

Behaviour
This is a terrestrial species of snake that is active at night, being a nocturnal in nature. The disposition of this species is placid and shy, often coiling loosely and hiding its head beneath its body when molested or threatened. It is very disinclined to bite unless persistently provoked.

Prey
Burmese kraits prey predominantly on other species of snakes, but they still occasionally do take small mammals such as rats and mice, lizards, frogs, and even fish.

Venom
Very little is known about the venom of this species. Like other species of krait, the venom is potent and contains both pre-synaptic and post-synaptic neurotoxins. There is no known antivenom for bites by this species. Bites of humans by this species are exceptionally rare, therefore no well-documented cases of human fatalities have been attributed to this species.

References

External links
 iNaturalist - Burmese krait
 Google Images

magnimaculatus
Snakes of Asia
Reptiles of Myanmar
Endemic fauna of Myanmar
Venomous snakes
Reptiles described in 1901
Taxa named by Frank Wall